Taddington is a village and civil parish in Derbyshire, England. The population of the civil parish, together with neighbouring Blackwell in the Peak and Brushfield parishes, as taken at the 2011 census, was 457. To the east, the A6 runs through Taddington Dale, while Taddington Moor lies to the west.

Taddington grew around farming and quarrying for limestone and lead.  From 1863 to 1967 the village was served by Millers Dale railway station, some two miles away, which was on the Midland Railway's extension of the Manchester, Buxton, Matlock and Midlands Junction Railway.

The village's main attractions are the Five Wells chambered tomb topped by a cairn, and the 14th-century church, with the remains of a 7th-century Celtic cross in the churchyard.  The two-metre cross shaft is decorated with an unusual chevron-based pattern.  It was at one time used to support a sink in the wall of a nearby public house.  A further possible cross base lies in the churchyard.

Notable buildings include Taddington Manor and Marlborough House.

Fields around the settlement show evidence of both Celtic lynchett terraces, and of mediaeval strip farming.

Taddington has two pubs, the Queens Arms and the Waterloo. In 2009 the Queens Arms opened a convenience store in the pub's pool room. There is an annual well dressing focussed on the "High Well", unusually lying above the village.

See also
Listed buildings in Taddington

References

DerbyshireUK: Taddington
peakdistrictonline: Taddington Guide
Kelly's Directory of the Counties of Derby, Notts, Leicester and Rutland (1891)
Tideswell and surrounding area

External links

Villages in Derbyshire
Towns and villages of the Peak District
Derbyshire Dales